The kabuto is an armored helmet traditionally worn by samurai.

Kabuto may also refer to:

Anime and manga 
Koji Kabuto, protagonist of Mazinger-Z and pilot of the titular mecha
Karasu Tengu Kabuto, a 1986 manga and anime by Buichi Terasawa
Kabuto Yakushi, a henchman of Naruto villain Orochimaru and later joins forces with Tobi
Kabuto Shiro, a character in the Mazinger anime and manga series
Kabuto Katsumi, a Tenjho Tenge character
Kabuto, the name of Usopp's new slingshot when he becomes Sogeking
Carnage Kabuto, the strongest creation of the House of Evolution in One-Punch Man

Live-action film and television 
Kamen Rider Kabuto, Kamen Rider television series
Kamen Rider Kabuto (character), a character within the above series
Kamen Rider Dark Kabuto, another character within the above series
B-Fighter Kabuto, a Japanese television series
Kabuto Raiger, a Ninpuu Sentai Hurricaneger character

Places 
Kabuto Rock, a large rock projecting from the coast of Antarctica
Mount Kabuto, a mountain in Nishinomiya, Hyōgo, Japan

Video games 
Kabuto (Pokémon), a Pokémon
Kabuto, a boss in the Sega Master System video game Alex Kidd in Shinobi World
The titular creature in Giants: Citizen Kabuto
Kabuto, leader of the Taraba Ninja Clan, appearing in Shinobido: Way of the Ninja

Other uses
 Japanese rhinoceros beetle, Allomyrina dichotoma, or kabutomushi (カブトムシ), a rhinoceros beetle named because of its resemblance to the kabuto helmet
 OGK Kabuto, a Japanese bicycle and motorcycle helmet company

See also 
Kabuto Station (disambiguation)